Gianni Sartori (born 2 December 1946) is a retired Italian track cyclist who specialized in the individual 1000 m time trial. In this event he won the world title in 1969, placing third at the 1968 World Championships and fourth at the 1968 Olympics.

References

External links
 

1946 births
Living people
Italian male cyclists
Olympic cyclists of Italy
Cyclists at the 1968 Summer Olympics
Cyclists from the Province of Vicenza